Toofani Tarzan (Typhoon Tarzan/Stormy Tarzan) is a 1937 Hindi action adventure film directed by Homi Wadia. Produced by Wadia Movietone, the film had music by Master Mohammed  with lyrics by Gyan Chander. It starred John Cawas, Gulshan, Nazira, Boman Shroff, Chandrashekhar and Dalpat.

The film typically had the theme of ‘mad scientists looking for the elixir of life’ as per Rosie Thomas (2005), cited by Gokulsing and Dissanayake  and was publicised as ‘India’s first jungle adventure film’ with remakes in the 1950s as Zimbo series.

Plot
Scientist Ramu and his wife Uma (Nazira) live with their four-year-old son Leher in the jungle where he carries out experiments. He has discovered the elixir of life. Lions attack their house killing him, while his wife goes mad with grief. Ramu’s son, Leher, and their little dog Moti, escape with the help of a half-man, half-ape called Dada (Boman Shroff). Several people arrive in the jungle fifteen years later from the city. One of them is Ramu’s father with his adopted daughter, Leela. Bihari, one of the people in the group wants the formula for his own purpose. The formula was put in a pendant around Leher’s neck by his father before he died. Leher now grown-up and known as Tarzan (John Cawas), has been brought up in the jungle and there are some amusing incidents between Leela and Tarzan, due to his lack of language skills. Tarzan saves Leela from Bihari’s unwanted advances. The story then moves to tribal cannibals trying to attack the group along with Tarzan, with ‘stunt scenes’ involving the cast and animals like elephants, the dog Moti, lions and apes. The story ends with the grandfather re-uniting with Tarzan and the mentally unstable mother meeting up with them.

Cast
 muhammad rehmani as Tarzan
 Gulshan as Leela
 Boman Shroff
 Chandrashekhar
 Dog Moti
 Nazira
 john crawn
 Chandrashekhar
 Dalpat
 Ahmed Dilawar

Music
The music was composed by Mohammed Master with lyrics by Pandit Gyan Chandra. There were three songs in

the film two of them sung by Ahmed Dilawar.

Songlist

References

External links

Story at Memsaab
Short clip at YouTube

1937 films
1930s Hindi-language films
Films directed by Homi Wadia
Jungle adventure films
Tarzan films
Indian action adventure films
Articles containing video clips
Indian black-and-white films
1930s action adventure films